The 2006 New York City Marathon was the 37th running of the annual marathon race in New York City, United States, which took place on Sunday, November 5. The men's elite race was won by Brazil's Marílson Gomes dos Santos in a time of 2:09:58 hours while the women's race was won by Latvia's Jeļena Prokopčuka in 2:25:05.

In the wheelchair races, Australia's Kurt Fearnley (1:29:22) and America's Amanda McGrory (1:54:17) won the men's and women's divisions, respectively. In the handcycle race, Lebanon's Edward Maalouf (1:25:36) and Monique van der Vorst (1:35:48) were the winners.

A total of 37,936 runners finished the race, 25,607 men and 12,329 women.

Results

Men

Rachid Ghanmouni of Morocco originally finished in  place in a time of  hours, but was retrospectively disqualified for doping.

Women

 † Ran in mass race

Wheelchair men

Wheelchair women

Handcycle men

Handcycle women

References

Results
2006 New York Marathon Results. New York Road Runners. Retrieved 2020-05-17.
Men's results. Association of Road Racing Statisticians. Retrieved 2020-04-12.
Women's results. Association of Road Racing Statisticians. Retrieved 2020-04-12.

External links

New York Road Runners website

2006
New York City
Marathon
New York City Marathon